In algebraic geometry, a Coble curve is an irreducible degree-6 planar curve with 10 double points (some of them may be infinitely near points). 

See also 
 Coble surface

References

Sextic curves